This article describes crime in the U.S. state of Colorado.

Statistics
In 2011, there were 151,125 crimes reported in Colorado.

In 2008, there were 158,236 crimes reported in Colorado, including 156 murders, 141,107 property crimes, and 2,094 rapes.

Capital punishment laws

Capital punishment is not applied in this state.

Notable crimes
Two of the country's largest mass shootings have occurred in Colorado: the Columbine High School massacre in 1999 and the Aurora movie theater massacre in 2012. Other notable mass shootings in Colorado include the Colorado YWAM and New Life shootings in 2007, the Colorado Springs Planned Parenthood shooting in 2015, the National Western Complex shootout in Denver in 2016, the 2021 Boulder shooting, the 2021 Colorado Springs shooting, and most recently the Colorado Springs nightclub shooting in 2022.

In 2004, Marvin Heemeyer, a business owner, used a modified bulldozer to smash into light poles, trees and buildings in Granby, Colorado.

See also
 Law of Colorado

References